Taramasalata or taramosalata (from  'fish roe' <  + Greek:  'salad' < ) is a meze made from tarama, the salted and cured roe (colloquially referred to as caviar) of the cod, carp, or grey mullet (bottarga) mixed with olive oil, lemon juice, and a starchy base of bread or potatoes, or sometimes almonds. Variants may include garlic, spring onions, or peppers, or vinegar instead of lemon juice. While not traditionally Greek, smoked rather than cured cod's roe is more widely available in some places, and often used. Bottarga is usually much more expensive than cod's roe.

Traditionally the dish is made with a pestle and mortar, giving a slightly grainy texture, but commercial taramasalata is commonly blended to a very smooth paste.

Taramasalata is usually served as a meze, often with ouzo, as a spread on bread. The colour can vary from creamy beige to pink, depending on the type of roe and colourings used. Most taramasalata sold commercially is dyed pink, but high quality taramasalata is always beige in colour.

In Greece, taramasalata is often served on Clean Monday, the first day of Great Lent, with onions and lemon.

Etymology
Borrowed from Greek word ταραμάς (roe), itself a borrowing from Turkish tarama. Normally, tarama is the salted roe itself, but sometimes the prepared dish is also called tarama.

The spelling taramosalata reflects the Greek, but in English the a spelling is common.

Salată de icre

It is made with pike or carp roe, but generally with sunflower or vegetable oil instead of olive oil, sometimes with a thickener like white bread. It is mass-produced and is widely available in grocery shops and supermarkets, as well as being made at home, in which case chopped onions are commonly added. It has a consistency and taste similar to mayonnaise, with the roe taking the place of the egg as protein. The traditional production method of salată de icre is standardized under the Romanian departmental standard N.I.D. 927-70 N 23 and registered as an EU Traditional Speciality Guaranteed under the name "Salată tradițională cu icre de crap". The roe of this product is for over 50% carp based.  

See also

List of condiments
Spread (food)

References

Turkish cuisine
Cypriot cuisine
Greek cuisine
Israeli cuisine
Dips (food)
Meze
Romanian cuisine
Bulgarian cuisine
Roe dishes
Cod dishes